This is a list of the largest trading partners of Italy based on data from the Ministry of Economic Development of Italy.

See also
Economy of Italy
List of the largest trading partners of the European Union
List of the largest trading partners of the United States
List of the largest trading partners of Germany
List of the largest trading partners of China
List of the largest trading partners of Russia
List of the largest trading partners of United Kingdom

References

Foreign trade of Italy
Economy-related lists of superlatives
Lists of trading partners
Economy of Italy-related lists